Bolshiye Gorki is a rural locality (a village) in Nagornoye Rural Settlement, Petushinsky District, Vladimir Oblast, Russia. The population was 27 as of 2010. There are three streets.

Geography 
Bolshiye Gorki is located 34 km northwest of Petushki (the district's administrative centre) by road. Malye Gorki is the nearest rural locality.

References 

Rural localities in Petushinsky District
Pokrovsky Uyezd